Horní Tošanovice is a municipality and village in Frýdek-Místek District in the Moravian-Silesian Region of the Czech Republic. It has about 700 inhabitants.

Etymology
The name is patronymic in origin derived from personal name Tosz. It was variably subscribed in the historical documents: Tessinowitz (1305), Thusnowitz (?, 1316), Tossinowicze (1445), Tossonowicze (1447, 1693), Toschonowitz (1523), Tossynowicze (1536, 1627), na Tossenowiczych (1703), Toschonowice (1724). In the 18th century the distinction between two villages developed. In 1736 both were mentioned as Nieder Toschonowitz and Ober Toschonowitz (literally "Lower" and "Upper"; Dolní and Horní in Czech).

Geography
Horní Tošanovice lies in the Moravian-Silesian Foothills, in the historical region of Cieszyn Silesia.

History
The first written mention of Tošanovice is in a Latin document of Diocese of Wrocław called Liber fundationis episcopatus Vratislaviensis from 1305. The village was probably founded in the 13th century. In 1445–1753, the manor was owned by the noble family of Tluka of Tošanovice. In the 1830s during the rule of the Harasovský family, an Empire style manor house with a small English park was built here.

Politically the village belonged initially to the Duchy of Teschen. In 1327 the duchy became a fee of the Kingdom of Bohemia, which after 1526 became part of the Habsburg monarchy.

After Revolutions of 1848 in the Austrian Empire a modern municipal division was introduced in the re-established Austrian Silesia. The village as a municipality was subscribed to the political and legal district of Cieszyn. According to the censuses conducted in 1880–1910, the population of the municipality grew from 460 in 1880 to 472 in 1910 with a majority being native Polish-speakers (52.2% in 1880, later between 88% and 93.1%) accompanied by a Czech-speaking minority (46% in 1880, later between 6.1% and 9.5%) and German-speaking (at most 8 or 2.5% in 1900). In terms of religion in 1910 the majority were Roman Catholics (74.8%), followed by Protestants (25.2%).

After World War I, Polish–Czechoslovak War and the division of Cieszyn Silesia in 1920, it became a part of Czechoslovakia. Following the Munich Agreement, in October 1938 together with the Zaolzie region it was annexed by Poland, administratively adjoined to Cieszyn County of Silesian Voivodeship. It was then annexed by Nazi Germany at the beginning of World War II. After the war it was restored to Czechoslovakia.

Transport
The D48 motorway runs through the municipality.

References

External links

 

Villages in Frýdek-Místek District
Cieszyn Silesia